Piotr Czachowski (born 7 November 1966) is a Polish former footballer.

Playing career
He played for several clubs in his native Poland, as well as Udinese in Italy and Dundee in Scotland. He was the third Polish player to sign with a Serie A club, after Zbigniew Boniek and Władysław Żmuda. With Legia Warsaw he played in the semifinals of 1991 Cup Winners' Cup, losing to Manchester United. He was capped Poland 45 times in the late 1980s and early 1990s. He held a record for most consecutive games from the debut in the national team. During his stint in Dundee he sustained an injury which eliminated him from the entire 1994/95 season; after the injury he never played again in the national team. In 1991 he was voted Polish footballer of the year.

Post-retirement
After retirement, he became a youth coach and PE teacher.

Style of play
Czachowski was a reliable defender who was valued for his marking. He was also an excellent tackler.

References

External links
 
 90minut.pl profile 

1966 births
Living people
Polish footballers
Poland international footballers
Polish expatriate footballers
Expatriate footballers in Scotland
Dundee F.C. players
Scottish Football League players
Expatriate footballers in Italy
Udinese Calcio players
Serie A players
Footballers from Warsaw
Stal Mielec players
Legia Warsaw players
Zagłębie Lubin players
ŁKS Łódź players
Aluminium Konin players
Association football defenders
Association football midfielders